Commonality was the second album released by Jeff Coffin, released in 1999.  This album was the first and, so far, only album released by Coffin as a solo artist.  His previous album being under the name Jeff Coffin Ensemble and subsequent albums recorded and released by the Jeff Coffin Mu'tet.

Track listing
All tracks by Jeff Coffin

"First Comes Last" – 5:17
"Salt Lick" – 4:51
"Commonality" – 9:47
"Espoo You" – 7:38
"Angle Of Repose" – 10:39
"Something Quick" – 10:42
"Outside, The Gray Sky Cries" – 6:18
"Who's Who" – 7:47
"Prayer" – 4:45

Personnel
Jeff Coffin - alto & tenor saxophones
Rod McGaha - trumpet 
Chris Enghauser - acoustic bass
Tom Giampietro - drums

References 

1999 albums
Jeff Coffin albums